Benjamin Dean (August 14, 1824 – April 9, 1897) was a member of the U.S. House of Representatives from Massachusetts.

Early life

Born in Clitheroe, Lancashire, England, U.K., fifth child of Alice Lofthouse and Benjamin Dean, he moved with his family to America at the age of five, and grew up in Lowell, Massachusetts. He attended Lowell schools and Dartmouth College. In 1845 he was admitted to the bar, and founded the Lowell firm of Dean & Dinsmoor, Attorneys. Dean continued his practice after moving to Boston in 1852.

Public service

Dean served in the Massachusetts Senate and on the Common Council of the City of Boston. Dean was elected as a Democrat to the 45th United States Congress, serving from 1878 to 1879. Dean was not a candidate for reëlection in 1878. Thereafter he resumed his law practice in Boston, and was chairman of the board of parks commissioners in his later years.

Personal life

Dean was married to Mary Anne French, daughter of Lowell Mayor Josiah Bowers French and a descendant of the Cotton and Mather families of Massachusetts Bay. They had six children, including marine artist Walter Lofthouse Dean and Judge Josiah Stevens Dean.

A 33-degree Mason, he served as grand master of the Grand Commandery of the United States from 1880 to 1883; and attended the Tricentennial Conclave in San Francisco in 1883 with his wife and youngest daughter, Mary.

He was a member of the Boston Yacht Club and owned Outer Brewster Island. Dean died in South Boston on April 9, 1897 and is buried at Lowell Cemetery.

See also
 84th Massachusetts General Court (1863)
 90th Massachusetts General Court (1869)

External links
 

1824 births
1897 deaths
People from Clitheroe
Massachusetts lawyers
Democratic Party Massachusetts state senators
British emigrants to the United States
Politicians from Lowell, Massachusetts
Democratic Party members of the United States House of Representatives from Massachusetts
19th-century American politicians
19th-century American lawyers